Boxing from Eastern Parkway was an American sports program broadcast by the DuMont Television Network from May 1952 to May 1954. The program aired boxing matches from Eastern Parkway Arena in Brooklyn, New York. The program aired Monday nights at 10pm ET and was 90 to 120 minutes long. During the 1953-1954 season, the program aired Mondays at 9pm ET.

Episode status
The UCLA Film and Television Archive has about 30 episodes in its collection, dating from December 1952 to October 1953.

See also
List of programs broadcast by the DuMont Television Network
List of surviving DuMont Television Network broadcasts
1952-53 United States network television schedule
1953-54 United States network television schedule
Boxing From Jamaica Arena (September 1948 – 1949)
Amateur Boxing Fight Club (September 1949 – 1950)
Wrestling From Marigold (September 1949 – 1955)
Boxing From St. Nicholas Arena (1954-1956)
Saturday Night at the Garden (1950-1951)

References

Bibliography
David Weinstein, The Forgotten Network: DuMont and the Birth of American Television (Philadelphia: Temple University Press, 2004) 
Alex McNeil, Total Television, Fourth edition (New York: Penguin Books, 1980) 
Tim Brooks and Earle Marsh, The Complete Directory to Prime Time Network TV Shows, Third edition (New York: Ballantine Books, 1964)

External links
Brief history of Eastern Parkway Arena

1952 American television series debuts
1954 American television series endings
American sports television series
Black-and-white American television shows
DuMont Television Network original programming
English-language television shows
Boxing television series
DuMont sports programming